("pot on the fire") is a French dish of slowly boiled meat and vegetables, usually served as two courses: first the broth (bouillon) and then the meat (bouilli) and vegetables. The dish is familiar throughout France, and has many regional variations. The best-known have beef as the main meat, but pork, ham, chicken and sausage are also used.

Background 
The Oxford Companion to Food calls pot-au-feu "a dish symbolic of French cuisine and a meal in itself"; the chef Raymond Blanc has called it "the quintessence of French family cuisine ... the most celebrated dish in France, [which] honours the tables of the rich and poor alike"; and the American National Geographic magazine has termed it the national dish of France.

The Dictionnaire de l'Académie française dates the term pot-au-feu to the 17th century. In 1600 the king of France, Henry IV, declared, "there shall be no peasant in my kingdom who lacks the means to have a hen in his pot."{{refn|"N'y aura point de Laboureur en mon Royaume, qui n'ait moyen d'avoir une poule dans son pot."|group=n}} A one-pot stew was a staple of French cooking, and the traditional recipe for poule-au-pot – also known as pot-au-feu à la béarnaise – resembles that for pot-au-feu.

One batch of pot-au-feu was maintained as a perpetual stew in Perpignan from the 15th century until World War II.

Ingredients 
The principal ingredient in most versions of pot-au-feu is beef. Many recipes specify more than one cut of beef to give both the broth and the cooked meat the required flavour and consistency. Elizabeth David writes that shin, because of its gelatinous properties, is good for the bouillon but produces a mediocre boulli, whereas a cut such as silverside cooks well for the boulli. For a large pot-au-feu it is practicable to use both those cuts or a mixture of others. Paul Bocuse calls for six different cuts: blade, brisket, entrecôte, oxtail, rib and shin. Some recipes add a marrow bone, to give marrow to spread on the bread served with the broth. Some recipes add ox liver to improve the clarity of the broth.

The inclusion of cabbage divides opinion; David comments that it is frequently encountered in France but in her view it "utterly wrecks" a pot-au-feu; Madame Saint-Ange takes a similar view.  Blanc, Édouard de Pomiane and Auguste Escoffier include it;  Bocuse, Alain Ducasse and Joël Robuchon omit it, as do Simone Beck, Louisette Bertholle and Julia Child, authors of Mastering the Art of French Cooking. As well as a bouquet garni – traditionally of parsley, thyme and bay – an onion studded with cloves may be added to the pot.

Regional variations include:pot-au-feu à l'albigeoise – with veal knuckle, salted pork knuckle, confit goose and sausage, in addition to beef and chicken.pot-au-feu à la béarnaise, also called Poule-au-pot– the basic pot-au-feu with a chicken stuffed with a forcemeat made of fresh pork and chopped ham, onion, garlic, parsley and chicken liver.pot-au-feu à la languedocienne – the basic pot-au-feu with the addition of a piece of fat bacon.pot-au-feu provençal – lamb or mutton replaces some of the beef.pot-au-feu aux pruneaux – the meats are beef and lightly-salted pork knuckle, cooked with the usual vegetables and prunes soaked in Armagnac.pot-au-feu madrilène – the meats are chicken, beef, veal, ham, bacon, chorizo sausage and boudin noir.

 Serving 
Generally, the broth (bouillon) is served first. It is often enriched with rice or pasta, and croutons and grated cheese may be added, before it is served with French bread. The meat (bouilli) and the vegetables are served next. Condiments may include, among other options, coarse salt, mustard, capers, pickled gherkins, pickled samphire and horseradish – grated or in a sauce. 

Sauces served with the bouilli may include tomato sauce, sauce Alsacienne (hard-boiled egg mayonnaise with herbs, capers and some of the bouillon), sauce Nénette (cream reduced by simmering and flavoured with mustard and tomato), or sauce Supréme (a velouté made with some of the bouillon and enriched with cream).Pot-au-feu broth may also be used for cooking vegetables or pasta. Ready-to-use concentrated cubes are available to make what purports to be pot-au-feu broth when water is added.

 Variants 
Other countries have similar dishes with local ingredients. The Vietnamese dish pho has been said to be inspired by French cuisine in former French Indochina, with a possible etymology for the name being a phonetic respelling of the French feu.

Notes, references and sources
Notes

References

Sources

 
 

 
 

 

See also

 Bigos Bollito misto Cazuela Cholent Cocido Cozido à portuguesa Sancochado (Peruvian)
 Eintopf Feu Hot pot (Steamboat)
 Jjigae Kig ha farz Lancashire hotpot
 List of stews
 New England boiled dinner
 Oden Olla podrida Perpetual stew
 Pho Pot roast
 Stew
 Potjiekos Tafelspitz''

French meat dishes
National dishes
Beef dishes